A list of translations of the Finnish national epic Kalevala in chronological order by language. The epic has appeared in 61 translated languages.

Based partially on the list made by Rauni Puranen and the article here.

References

Translations
Translation-related lists
Translators from Finnish